Wiremu Hoani Taua (1862 – 29 December 1919) was a New Zealand tribal leader and school principal. Of Māori descent, he identified with the Ngati Kahu iwi. He was born in Kareponia, Northland, New Zealand in 1862.

References

1862 births
1919 deaths
New Zealand schoolteachers
New Zealand Māori schoolteachers
Ngāti Kahu people